Las Bellostas is a locality located in the municipality of Aínsa-Sobrarbe, in Huesca province, Aragon, Spain. As of 2020, it has a population of 7.

Geography 
Las Bellostas is located 83km northeast of Huesca.

References

Populated places in the Province of Huesca